Northwood Community Park is located in the Northwood community on the corner of Bryan and Yale in the city of Irvine in Orange County, California. The park, built in 1980 on the site of a former citrus packing facility, is also known as "Castle Park" among the neighborhood kids for its fort structure.  Northwood Community Park is the home of Winslow Field which hosts PONY baseball games. Winslow Field was named after Chuck Winslow in 1982 for his inspiration and contributions toward the Village of Northwood.

Park Amenities
 1 multi-use building
 3 restrooms
 4 drinking fountains
 1 child play area
 1 open play area
 2 soccer fields
 2 lighted tennis courts
 1/2 basketball court
 1 ball diamond
 Bicycle trail access
 4 barbecues
 2 group picnic areas
 14 picnic tables
 Electrical outlets
 Shuffleboard courts
 1/2 mile track
 Iraq and Afghanistan war memorial

Northwood Gratitude and Honor Memorial

The Northwood Gratitude and Honor Memorial is a permanent memorial in remembrance of all the US service members who have died in the current Iraq and Afghanistan wars. The Memorial was dedicated on November 14, 2010, with 5,714 engraved names. This is the only known permanent national memorial listing the names of all the American service members who have died in these wars. The Memorial will be updated as long as American service members are killed in these conflicts.

References

Geography of Irvine, California
Parks in Orange County, California
Municipal parks in California